Moment of Indiscretion is a low budget 1958 British crime film.

Plot
Janet Miller is accused of the murder of a stabbed woman. Janet's handkerchief and spare house key have been discovered at the crime scene, and she is cagey about her whereabouts on the night in question. It turns out she was a witness to the murder, but has her own reasons for keeping quiet. Her lawyer husband John leaps to her defence and attempts to track down the real killer.

(Two discrepancies occur leading to the identification of the real culprit: firstly, the witness, played by Lana Morris, positively identifies him, and tells the police she'll never forget his face; yet, whilst witnessing the murder, she only ever sees his back. Just as, in fact, her character is depicted,  (above), witnessing it on the film's cinema poster.

Also, the film was made and set in 1958; yet the pawnshop ticket, which provides the final evidence of an event which was supposed to have occurred just a few months before, was dated "February 1956").

Cast
John Miller - 	Ronald Howard
Janet Miller - 	Lana Morris
Inspector Marsh - 	Denis Shaw
D/Sgt. Field - 	 Piers Keelan
Brian - 	John Witty
Corby - 	John Van Eyssen
Pauline - 	Ann Lynn
 Mrs. Cartier - Totti Truman Taylor
 Mr. Evans - Robert Dorning
Vicki - 	 Judy Bruce

References

External links

Moment of Indiscretion at New York Times

1958 films
British crime films
1958 crime films
1950s English-language films
1950s British films